38 (thirty-eight) is the natural number following 37 and preceding 39.

In mathematics
38! − 1 yields  which is the 16th factorial prime.
There is no answer to the equation φ(x) = 38, making 38 a nontotient.
38 is the sum of the squares of the first three primes.
37 and 38 are the first pair of consecutive positive integers not divisible by any of their digits.
38 is the largest even number which cannot be written as the sum of two odd composite numbers.
The sum of each row of the only non-trivial (order 3) magic hexagon is 38.

In science
The atomic number of strontium

Astronomy
The Messier object M38, a magnitude 7.0 open cluster in the constellation Auriga
The New General Catalogue object NGC 38, a spiral galaxy in the constellation Pisces

In other fields

Thirty-eight is also:
 The 38th parallel north is the pre-Korean War boundary between North Korea and South Korea.
 The number of slots on an American roulette wheel (0, 00, and 1 through 36; European roulette does not use the 00 slot and has only 37 slots)
 The Ishihara test is a color vision test consisting of 38 pseudoisochromatic plates.
 A "38" is often the name for a snub nose .38 caliber revolver.
 The 38 class is the most famous class of steam locomotive used in New South Wales
 Gerald Ford, 38th President of the United States
 Arnold Schwarzenegger, 38th Governor of California, most recent Republican governor of California, and the second governor to be born outside of the United States
Cats have a total of 38 chromosomes in their genome.
 Number used by Zane Smith and Front Row Motorsports to win the 2022 NASCAR Camping World Truck Series championship.

See also
 List of highways numbered 38

References

Integers